Trapnell is a surname. Notable people with the surname include:

Anna Trapnell, alleged Prophetess in England in the 1650s
Barry Trapnell (1924–2012), English first-class cricketer
Coles Trapnell (1910–1999), American television producer, writer, and director
Frederick M. Trapnell (1902–1975), United States Navy admiral and aviation pioneer
Garrett Brock Trapnell (1938–1993), con man, bank robber, and aircraft hijacker of the 1960s and early 1970s
Thomas J. H. Trapnell (1902–2002), United States Army general